Colorado was admitted to the Union on August 1, 1876 and elects U.S. senators to Senate Class 2 and Class 3. Its current U.S. senators are Democrats Michael Bennet (serving since 2009) and John Hickenlooper (serving since 2021). Henry M. Teller was Colorado's longest-serving senator (1876–1882; 1885–1909).

List of senators

|- style="height:2em"
| colspan=3 | Vacant
| Aug 1, 1876 –Nov 15, 1876
| Colorado did not elect its senators until three months after statehood.
| rowspan=2 | 1
| 
| rowspan=3 | 1
| Colorado did not elect its senators until three months after statehood.
| Aug 1, 1876 –Nov 15, 1876
| colspan=3 | Vacant

|- style="height:2em"
! rowspan=4 | 1
| rowspan=4 align=left | Henry M. Teller
| rowspan=4  | Republican
| rowspan=4 nowrap | Nov 15, 1876 –Apr 17, 1882
| Elected in 1876.
| rowspan=2 | Elected in 1876.Retired.
| rowspan=2 nowrap | Nov 15, 1876 –Mar 3, 1879
| rowspan=2  | Republican
| rowspan=2 align=right | Jerome B. Chaffee
! rowspan=2 | 1

|- style="height:2em"
| rowspan=3 | Elected to next term in 1876 or 1877.Resigned to become U.S. Secretary of the Interior.
| rowspan=5 | 2
| 

|- style="height:2em"
| 
| rowspan=5 | 2
| rowspan=5 | Elected in 1879.Lost re-nomination.
| rowspan=5 nowrap | Mar 4, 1879 –Mar 3, 1885
| rowspan=5  | Republican
| rowspan=5 align=right | Nathaniel P. Hill
! rowspan=5 | 2

|- style="height:2em"
| rowspan=3 

|- style="height:2em"
! 2
| align=left | George M. Chilcott
|  | Republican
| nowrap | Apr 17, 1882 –Jan 27, 1883
| Appointed to continue Teller's term.Did not run to finish the term.

|- style="height:2em"
! 3
| align=left | Horace Tabor
|  | Republican
| nowrap | Jan 27, 1883 –Mar 3, 1883
| Elected to finish Teller's term.Retired.

|- style="height:2em"
! rowspan=3 | 4
| rowspan=3 align=left | Thomas M. Bowen
| rowspan=3  | Republican
| rowspan=3 nowrap | Mar 4, 1883 –Mar 3, 1889
| rowspan=3 | Election date unknown.Unknown if retired or lost re-election.
| rowspan=3 | 3
| 

|- style="height:2em"
| 
| rowspan=3 | 3
| rowspan=3 | Elected in 1885.
| rowspan=12 nowrap | Mar 4, 1885 –Mar 3, 1909
| rowspan=6  | Republican
| rowspan=12 align=right | Henry M. Teller
! rowspan=12 | 3

|- style="height:2em"
| 

|- style="height:2em"
! rowspan=6 | 5
| rowspan=6 align=left | Edward O. Wolcott
| rowspan=6  | Republican
| rowspan=6 nowrap | Mar 4, 1889 –Mar 3, 1901
| rowspan=3 | Elected in 1889.
| rowspan=3 | 4
| 

|- style="height:2em"
| 
| rowspan=3 | 4
| rowspan=3 | Re-elected in 1891.

|- style="height:2em"
| 

|- style="height:2em"
| rowspan=3 | Re-elected in 1895.Lost re-election.
| rowspan=3 | 5
| 

|- style="height:2em"
| 
| rowspan=3 | 5
| rowspan=3 | Re-elected in 1897.
| rowspan=3  | Silver Republican

|- style="height:2em"
| 

|- style="height:2em"
! rowspan=3 | 6
| rowspan=3 align=left | Thomas M. Patterson
| rowspan=3  | Democratic
| rowspan=3 nowrap | Mar 4, 1901 –Mar 3, 1907
| rowspan=3 | Elected in 1901.Retired.
| rowspan=3 | 6
| 

|- style="height:2em"
| 
| rowspan=3 | 6
| rowspan=3 | Re-elected in 1903.Retired.
| rowspan=3  | Democratic

|- style="height:2em"
| 

|- style="height:2em"
! rowspan=5 | 7
| rowspan=5 align=left | Simon Guggenheim
| rowspan=5  | Republican
| rowspan=5 nowrap | Mar 4, 1907 –Mar 3, 1913
| rowspan=5 | Elected in 1907.Retired.
| rowspan=5 | 7
| 

|- style="height:2em"
| rowspan=2 
| rowspan=5 | 7
| Elected in 1909.Died.
| nowrap | Mar 4, 1909 –Jan 11, 1911
|  | Democratic
| align=right | Charles J. Hughes Jr.
! 4

|- style="height:2em"
| rowspan=2 |  
| rowspan=2 nowrap | Jan 11, 1911 –Jan 15, 1913
| rowspan=2 colspan=3 | Vacant

|- style="height:2em"
| rowspan=2 

|- style="height:2em"
| rowspan=2 | Elected to finish Hughes's term.
| rowspan=5 nowrap | Jan 15, 1913 –Mar 3, 1921
| rowspan=5  | Democratic
| rowspan=5 align=right | Charles S. Thomas
! rowspan=5 | 5

|- style="height:2em"
! rowspan=3 | 8
| rowspan=3 align=left | John F. Shafroth
| rowspan=3  | Democratic
| rowspan=3 nowrap | Mar 4, 1913 –Mar 3, 1919
| rowspan=3 | Elected in 1913.Lost re-election.
| rowspan=3 | 8
| 

|- style="height:2em"
| 
| rowspan=3 | 8
| rowspan=3 | Re-elected in 1914.Lost re-election.

|- style="height:2em"
| 

|- style="height:2em"
! rowspan=9 | 9
| rowspan=9 align=left | Lawrence C. Phipps
| rowspan=9  | Republican
| rowspan=9 nowrap | Mar 4, 1919 –Mar 3, 1931
| rowspan=6 | Elected in 1918.
| rowspan=6 | 9
| 

|- style="height:2em"
| 
| rowspan=6 | 9
| rowspan=2 | Elected in 1920.Died.
| rowspan=2 nowrap | Mar 4, 1921 –Mar 24, 1923
| rowspan=2  | Republican
| rowspan=2 align=right | Samuel D. Nicholson
! rowspan=2 | 6

|- style="height:2em"
| rowspan=4 

|- style="height:2em"
|  
| nowrap | Mar 24, 1923 –May 17, 1923
| colspan=3 | Vacant

|- style="height:2em"
| Appointed to continue Nicholson's term.Retired.
| nowrap | May 17, 1923 –Nov 30, 1924
|  | Democratic
| align=right | Alva B. Adams
! 7

|- style="height:2em"
| rowspan=2 | Elected to finish Nicholson's term.Lost renomination.
| rowspan=2 nowrap | Dec 1, 1924 –Mar 3, 1927
| rowspan=2  | Republican
| rowspan=2 align=right | Rice W. Means
! rowspan=2 | 8

|- style="height:2em"
| rowspan=3 | Re-elected in 1924.Retired.
| rowspan=3 | 10
| 

|- style="height:2em"
| 
| rowspan=6 | 10
| rowspan=3 | Elected in 1926.Died.
| rowspan=3 nowrap | Mar 4, 1927 –Aug 27, 1932
| rowspan=3  | Republican
| rowspan=3 align=right | Charles W. Waterman
! rowspan=3 | 9

|- style="height:2em"
| 

|- style="height:2em"
! rowspan=6 | 10
| rowspan=6 align=left | Edward P. Costigan
| rowspan=6  | Democratic
| rowspan=6 nowrap | Mar 4, 1931 –Jan 3, 1937
| rowspan=6 | Elected in 1930.Retired.
| rowspan=6 | 11
| rowspan=4 

|- style="height:2em"
|  
| nowrap | Aug 27, 1932 –Sep 26, 1932
| colspan=3 | Vacant

|- style="height:2em"
| Appointed to continue Waterman's term.Lost election to finish Waterman's term.
| nowrap | Sep 26, 1932 –Dec 6, 1932
|  | Democratic
| align=right | Walter Walker
! 10

|- style="height:2em"
| Elected to finish Waterman's term.Lost election to next term.
| nowrap | Dec 7, 1932 –Mar 3, 1933
|  | Republican
| align=right | Karl C. Schuyler
! 11

|- style="height:2em"
| 
| rowspan=3 | 11
| rowspan=3 | Elected in 1932.
| rowspan=5 nowrap | Mar 4, 1933 –Dec 1, 1941
| rowspan=5  | Democratic
| rowspan=5 align=right | Alva B. Adams
! rowspan=5 | 12

|- style="height:2em"
| 

|- style="height:2em"
! rowspan=11 | 11
| rowspan=11 align=left | Edwin C. Johnson
| rowspan=11  | Democratic
| rowspan=11 nowrap | Jan 3, 1937 –Jan 3, 1955
| rowspan=5 | Elected in 1936.
| rowspan=5 | 12
| 

|- style="height:2em"
| 
| rowspan=5 | 12
| rowspan=2 | Re-elected in 1938.Died.

|- style="height:2em"
| rowspan=3 

|- style="height:2em"
|  
| nowrap | Dec 1, 1941 –Dec 20, 1941
| colspan=3 | Vacant

|- style="height:2em"
| rowspan=2 | Appointed to continue Adams's term.Elected in 1942 to finish Adams's term.
| rowspan=8 nowrap | Dec 20, 1941 –Jan 3, 1957
| rowspan=8  | Republican
| rowspan=8 align=right | Eugene Millikin
! rowspan=8 | 13

|- style="height:2em"
| rowspan=3 | Re-elected in 1942.
| rowspan=3 | 13
| 

|- style="height:2em"
| 
| rowspan=3 | 13
| rowspan=3 | Re-elected in 1944.

|- style="height:2em"
| 

|- style="height:2em"
| rowspan=3 | Re-elected in 1948.Retired.
| rowspan=3 | 14
| 

|- style="height:2em"
| 
| rowspan=3 | 14
| rowspan=3 | Re-elected in 1950.Retired.

|- style="height:2em"
| 

|- style="height:2em"
! rowspan=9 | 12
| rowspan=9 align=left | Gordon Allott
| rowspan=9  | Republican
| rowspan=9 nowrap | Jan 3, 1955 –Jan 3, 1973
| rowspan=3 | Elected in 1954.
| rowspan=3 | 15
| 

|- style="height:2em"
| 
| rowspan=3 | 15
| rowspan=3 | Elected in 1956.Lost re-election.
| rowspan=3 nowrap | Jan 3, 1957 –Jan 3, 1963
| rowspan=3  | Democratic
| rowspan=3 align=right | John A. Carroll
! rowspan=3 | 14

|- style="height:2em"
| 

|- style="height:2em"
| rowspan=3 | Re-elected in 1960.
| rowspan=3 | 16
| 

|- style="height:2em"
| 
| rowspan=3 | 16
| rowspan=3 | Elected in 1962.
| rowspan=6 nowrap | Jan 3, 1963 –Jan 3, 1975
| rowspan=6  | Republican
| rowspan=6 align=right | Peter H. Dominick
! rowspan=6 | 15

|- style="height:2em"
| 

|- style="height:2em"
| rowspan=3 | Re-elected in 1966.Lost re-election.
| rowspan=3 | 17
| 

|- style="height:2em"
| 
| rowspan=3 | 17
| rowspan=3 | Re-elected in 1968.Lost re-election.

|- style="height:2em"
| 

|- style="height:2em"
! rowspan=3 | 13
| rowspan=3 align=left | Floyd Haskell
| rowspan=3  | Democratic
| rowspan=3 nowrap | Jan 3, 1973 –Jan 3, 1979
| rowspan=3 | Elected in 1972.Lost re-election.
| rowspan=3 | 18
| 

|- style="height:2em"
| 
| rowspan=3 | 18
| rowspan=3 | Elected in 1974.
| rowspan=6 nowrap | Jan 3, 1975 –Jan 3, 1987
| rowspan=6  | Democratic
| rowspan=6 align=right | Gary Hart
! rowspan=6 | 16

|- style="height:2em"
| 

|- style="height:2em"
! rowspan=6 | 14
| rowspan=6 align=left | William L. Armstrong
| rowspan=6  | Republican
| rowspan=6 nowrap | Jan 3, 1979 –Jan 3, 1991
| rowspan=3 | Elected in 1978.
| rowspan=3 | 19
| 

|- style="height:2em"
| 
| rowspan=3 | 19
| rowspan=3 | Re-elected in 1980.Retired.

|- style="height:2em"
| 

|- style="height:2em"
| rowspan=3 | Re-elected in 1984.Retired.
| rowspan=3 | 20
| 

|- style="height:2em"
| 
| rowspan=3 | 20
| rowspan=3 | Elected in 1986.Retired.
| rowspan=3 nowrap | Jan 3, 1987 –Jan 3, 1993
| rowspan=3  | Democratic
| rowspan=3 align=right | Tim Wirth
! rowspan=3 | 17

|- style="height:2em"
| 

|- style="height:2em"
! rowspan=4 | 15
| rowspan=4 align=left | Hank Brown
| rowspan=4  | Republican
| rowspan=4 nowrap | Jan 3, 1991 –Jan 3, 1997
| rowspan=4 | Elected in 1990.Retired.
| rowspan=4 | 21
| 

|- style="height:2em"
| 
| rowspan=4 | 21
| rowspan=4 | Elected in 1992.Changed parties in 1995.
| rowspan=7 nowrap | Jan 3, 1993 –Jan 3, 2005
| rowspan=2  | Democratic
| rowspan=7 align=right | Ben Nighthorse Campbell
! rowspan=7 | 18

|- style="height:2em"
| rowspan=2 

|- style="height:2em"
| rowspan=5  | Republican

|- style="height:2em"
! rowspan=6 | 16
| rowspan=6 align=left | Wayne Allard
| rowspan=6  | Republican
| rowspan=6 nowrap | Jan 3, 1997 –Jan 3, 2009
| rowspan=3 | Elected in 1996.
| rowspan=3 | 22
| 

|- style="height:2em"
| 
| rowspan=3 | 22
| rowspan=3 | Re-elected in 1998.Retired.

|- style="height:2em"
| 

|- style="height:2em"
| rowspan=3 | Re-elected in 2002.Retired.
| rowspan=3 | 23
| 

|- style="height:2em"
| 
| rowspan=4 | 23
| rowspan=3 | Elected in 2004.Resigned to become U.S. Secretary of the Interior.
| rowspan=3 nowrap | Jan 3, 2005 –Jan 20, 2009
| rowspan=3  | Democratic
| rowspan=3 align=right | Ken Salazar
! rowspan=3 | 19

|- style="height:2em"
| 

|- style="height:2em"
! rowspan=4 | 17
| rowspan=4 align=left | Mark Udall
| rowspan=4  | Democratic
| rowspan=4 nowrap | Jan 3, 2009 –Jan 3, 2015
| rowspan=4 | Elected in 2008.Lost re-election.
| rowspan=4 | 24
| rowspan=2 

|- style="height:2em"
| Appointed to finish Salazar's term.
| rowspan=10 nowrap | Jan 21, 2009 –Present
| rowspan=10  | Democratic
| rowspan=10 align=right | Michael Bennet
! rowspan=10 | 20

|- style="height:2em"
| 
| rowspan=3 | 24
| rowspan=3 | Elected to a full term in 2010.

|- style="height:2em"
| 

|- style="height:2em"
! rowspan=3 | 18
| rowspan=3 align=left | Cory Gardner
| rowspan=3  | Republican
| rowspan=3 nowrap | Jan 3, 2015 –Jan 3, 2021
| rowspan=3 | Elected in 2014.Lost re-election.
| rowspan=3 | 25
| 

|- style="height:2em"
| 
| rowspan=3 | 25
| rowspan=3 | Re-elected in 2016.

|- style="height:2em"
| 

|- style="height:2em"
! rowspan=3 | 19
| rowspan=3 align=left | John Hickenlooper
| rowspan=3  | Democratic
| rowspan=3 nowrap | Jan 3, 2021 –Present
| rowspan=3 | Elected in 2020.
| rowspan=3 | 26
| 

|- style="height:2em"
| 
| rowspan=3 |26
| rowspan=3 | Re-elected in 2022.

|- style="height:2em"
| 

|- style="height:2em"
| rowspan=2 colspan=5 | To be determined in the 2026 election.
| rowspan=2 | 27
| 

|- style="height:2em"
| 
| 27
| colspan=5 | To be determined in the 2028 election.

See also

United States congressional delegations from Colorado
List of United States representatives from Colorado
Elections in Colorado

Notes

References 
 

 
United States Senators
Colorado